Boboye is a department of the Dosso Region in Niger. Its capital lies at the city of Birni N'Gaouré. As of 2011, the department had a total population of 372,904 people.

References

Departments of Niger
Dosso Region